Phrixosceles campsigrapha is a moth of the family Gracillariidae. It is known from Sri Lanka

References

Gracillariinae
Moths of Sri Lanka
Moths described in 1908